David J. Kennedy (February 11, 1907 – July 11, 1995) was a Maine politician and pharmacist. He was a native of Milbridge, Maine. Kennedy, a Republican, represented Milbridge in Washington County from 1959 to 1972, including terms as Speaker of the Maine House of Representatives from 1963 to 1964 and again from 1967 to 1972. He retired from politics in 1972. He was close friends with Portland Democrat Dana Childs and briefly served as a lobbyist for Maine Central Railroad alongside Childs. Kennedy died on July 11, 1995, at Maine Coast Memorial Hospital in Ellsworth of natural causes.

References

1907 births
1995 deaths
People from Washington County, Maine
Republican Party members of the Maine House of Representatives
American lobbyists
Speakers of the Maine House of Representatives
Pharmacists from Maine
20th-century American politicians
People from Milbridge, Maine